Adam Włodek (8 August 1922, in Kraków – 19 January 1986, in Kraków) was a Polish poet, editor and translator.

He was married to Polish Nobel Prize laureate, Wisława Szymborska  between 1948 - 1954. He published 10 books, mostly collections of his poems. He was also the editor of several Polish newspapers including Dziennik Polski, and translated works from Czech and Slovak languages into Polish.

1922 births
1986 deaths
20th-century Polish poets
Writers from Kraków
Polish translators
20th-century translators
Polish male poets
20th-century Polish male writers